Aşağıdere (literally "lower brook" or "below is a brook") is a Turkish place name that may refer to the following places in Turkey:

 Aşağıdere, Bartın, a village in the district of Bartın, Bartın Province
 Aşağıdere, Ilgaz
 Aşağıdere, Ulus, a village in the district of Ulus, Bartın Province